The Boston Militia were a women's full-contact football team in the Women's Football Alliance of which they were two-time champions (2011, 2014). Previously, the Militia played in the Independent Women's Football League from 2008 until 2010, winning the IWFL championship in 2010. Based in Boston, Massachusetts, the Militia played its home games at Dilboy Stadium in nearby Somerville.

On January 5, 2015, the team announced they were discontinuing operations due to a lack of teams to play against in the region. Following a transfer of ownership, the team has been reorganized as the Boston Renegades.

Season-by-season 

|-
| colspan="6" align="center" | Boston Militia (IWFL)
|-
|2008 || 6 || 2 || 0 || T-2nd Tier 1 Eastern North Atlantic || --
|-
|2009 || 8 || 0 || 0 || 1st Tier 1 Eastern North Atlantic || Won Eastern Conference Semifinal (Dallas)Lost Eastern Conference Championship (D.C.)
|-
|2010 || 8 || 0 || 0 || 1st Tier 1 Eastern Northeast || Won Eastern Conference Semifinal (New York)Won Eastern Conference Championship (D.C.)Won IWFL World Championship (Sacramento)
|-
| colspan="6" align="center" | Boston Militia (WFA)
|-
|2011 || 7 || 1 || 0 || 1st National North || Won National Conference Quarterfinal (D.C.)Won National Conference Semifinal (Chicago)Won National Conference Championship (Indy)Won WFA National Championship (San Diego)
|-
|2012 || 8 || 0 || 0 || 1st National Division 2 || Won National Conference Quarterfinal (New York)Won National Conference Semifinal (D.C.)Lost National Conference Championship (Chicago)
|-
|2013 || 8 || 0 || 0 || 1st National Division 1 || Won National Conference Quarterfinal (Pittsburgh)Won National Conference Semifinal (D.C.)Lost National Conference Championship (Chicago)
|-
|2014 || 7 || 0 || 0 || 1st National Northeast || Won National Conference Quarterfinal (Cleveland)Won National Conference Semifinal (D.C.)Won National Conference Championship (Chicago)Won WFA National Championship (San Diego)
|-
!Totals || 68 || 6 || 0
|colspan="2"|(including playoffs)

2008

Recap
The Boston Militia opened their inaugural season on April 12, 2008, with a home win against the D.C. Divas 27–22. The Militia finished with a 6-2 regular-season record in the Independent Women's Football League (IWFL).

Schedule

Standings

The Boston Militia finished the season with the league's fifth highest Massey Rating of 1.38.

2009

Recap
In their second season, the Militia went undefeated in the regular season with an 8–0 record. In the divisional playoffs round, Boston defeated the defending IWFL champion Dallas Diamonds 34–14 at Dilboy Stadium. Then the Militia also hosted the Conference Championship, but lost to the D.C. Divas 21–27, ending Boston's season just one victory short of the league title game.

Schedule

Standings

The Boston Militia finished with the league's third highest Massey Rating of 1.67.

2010

Recap
In their third season, the Boston Militia posted an 8–0 record in the regular season (with one victory coming by forfeit). They then hosted a divisional playoff game versus the New York Sharks, prevailing 26–6. After shutting out the D.C. Divas 28–0 at Dilboy Stadium in the Eastern Conference championship game, the Militia defeated the Sacramento Sirens 39–7 on July 24, 2010, in Round Rock, Texas to win the IWFL World Championship. It is the franchise's first national championship title.

Schedule

Standings

The Boston Militia finished the season with a Massey Rating of 2.14.

2011

Recap
In their fourth season, the Militia joined the Women's Football Alliance (WFA) and finished the regular season at 7–1 to earn a playoff berth. Boston defeated the D.C. Divas 37–24 on the road in a conference quarterfinal game. The Militia then traveled to Chicago to defeat the Chicago Force 50–23 in a conference semifinal game. By virtue of an upset in the other conference semifinal game, Boston was able to host the WFA National Conference Championship against the Indy Crash. Boston prevailed 46–18 to earn its second consecutive trip to a league title game. On July 30, 2011, in Bedford, Texas, the Boston Militia toppled the previously undefeated San Diego Surge 34–19 to win the WFA National Championship. Halfback Whitney Zelee was named the game's Most Valuable Player. It is the franchise's second national championship title.

Head Coach Derrick Beasley received the WFA Coach of the Year Award, and quarterback Allison Cahill received the WFA National Conference Offensive Player of the Year Award.

Schedule

Standings

The Boston Militia finished the season with the league's highest Massey Rating of 2.27.

2012

Recap
In their fifth season, the Boston Militia posted an 8–0 record in the regular season. After defeating the New York Sharks 47–6 at home in a conference quarterfinal game, Boston faced the D.C. Divas in the conference semifinals, prevailing at Dilboy Stadium 55–34. The Militia then traveled to Lazier Field to meet the Chicago Force in the WFA National Conference championship. Emerging from halftime facing a 21-point deficit, a remarkable comeback by the Militia fell short by a missed extra point attempt. The final score was 34–35, ending Boston's season just one victory short of the league title game.

Schedule

Standings

The Boston Militia finished the season with the league's second highest Massey Rating of 2.31.

2013

Recap
In their sixth season, the Boston Militia posted an 8–0 record in a regular season highlighted by two record-setting performances. The Boston Militia and the D.C. Divas shattered the women's football record for most combined points in a single game, with an 81–54 final score on May 18, 2013. And Militia running back Whitney Zelee eclipsed the 2,000-yard benchmark and set new league records of 2,138 rushing yards over the eight-game regular season and 2,832 rushing yards over the entire championship season. Zelee's achievements earned her the National Conference MVP Award. After defeating the Pittsburgh Passion 63–28 at home in the National Conference quarterfinals, Boston faced the D.C. Divas in the conference semifinals, prevailing at Dilboy Stadium 58–34. The Militia then traveled to Lazier Field to meet the Chicago Force in the WFA National Conference championship. The Militia fell to the favored Force team 27–46, ending Boston's season just one victory short of the league title game for the second year in a row.

Schedule

Standings

The Boston Militia finished the season with the league's second highest Massey Rating of 2.21.

2014

Recap
In their seventh season, the Boston Militia posted a 7–0 record in a regular season highlighted by two narrow victories over the D.C. Divas and first-ever regular-season contests against the Chicago Force and the Cleveland Fusion. Boston's regular-season victory over Chicago at a neutral location (Munhall, Pennsylvania, hosted by the Pittsburgh Force) ultimately gave the Militia home field advantage in the playoffs. After defeating the Cleveland Fusion 47–6 in the National Conference quarterfinals at Dilboy Stadium, Boston outpaced the D.C. Divas at home in the highest scoring postseason game in women's tackle football history 72–56.  The Militia next hosted the WFA National Conference Championship where they handed the Chicago Force their biggest losing margin in their 11-year history 69–14. On August 2, 2014, in Chicago, Illinois, the Boston Militia trounced the San Diego Surge 69–34 to win their second WFA National Championship. Halfback Whitney Zelee was named the game's Most Valuable Player. With the victory, the Boston Militia are the only team to date who have won multiple WFA championships. It is the franchise's third national championship title overall (2010, 2011, 2014).

Head Coach Derrick Beasley received the WFA Coach of the Year Award, quarterback Allison Cahill received the WFA National Conference Most Valuable Player Award and linebacker Noriko Kokura received the WFA National Conference Defensive Player of the Year Award.

Schedule

Standings

The Boston Militia finished the season with the league's highest Massey Rating of 2.56.

Roster

References 
The data presented above has been sourced from official league or team websites unless otherwise noted.

External links 
 
 

American football teams in Massachusetts
Women's Football Alliance teams
Somerville, Massachusetts
Sports in Middlesex County, Massachusetts
American football teams established in 2008
American football teams disestablished in 2015
2008 establishments in Massachusetts
2015 disestablishments in Massachusetts